Trouble in Tahiti is a one-act opera in seven scenes composed by Leonard Bernstein with an English libretto by the composer. It is the darkest among Bernstein's "musicals", and one of only two for which he wrote the words and the music. (He also wrote the lyrics for the 1950 production of Peter Pan.) Trouble in Tahiti received its first performance on 12 June 1952 at Bernstein's Festival of the Creative Arts on the campus of Brandeis University in Waltham, Massachusetts, to an audience of nearly 3,000 people. The NBC Opera Theatre subsequently presented the opera on television in November 1952, a production which marked mezzo-soprano Beverly Wolff's professional debut in the role of Dinah. Wolff later reprised the role in the New York City Opera's first staging of the work in 1958. The original work is about 40 minutes long.

Background
Bernstein was working on the opera during his honeymoon with Felicia Montealegre. The story is based on the relationship of Bernstein's own parents, Sam and Jennie, but the wife's name was changed to the more singable Dinah, Bernstein's grandmother. The work is dedicated to Marc Blitzstein; Blitzstein and Bernstein were good friends, both alumni of the Curtis Institute in Philadelphia. Bernstein had produced one production of Blitzstein's The Cradle Will Rock.

Plot analysis
The opera is frequently performed with minimal scenery (although Bernstein gave detailed instructions for drops and props) and very simple costumes. There are only two soloists, a married couple named Sam and Dinah. Their son, Junior, is often referred to but is never seen or heard. Other characters are addressed in certain scenes but also are never seen or heard: Sam's client Mr Partridge (on the telephone); his friend Bill (present and interacting with Sam but intended to be invisible); his secretary Miss Brown (present but intended to be invisible); Dinah's psychoanalyst ("invisible"); her milliner ("imaginary").

Trouble in Tahiti is the story of one day in the life of these desperately unhappy, though married people, lonely, longing for love, and unable to communicate. At the end of the opera, Sam and Dinah show a willingness to sacrifice for each other, out of commitment to the marriage, though there's not much pleasure to be had. A copyright is held for an alternate ending by Bernstein, which has not been released.

Roles

Synopsis

Prelude – A smiling jazz trio sings of perfect life in an affluent, unnamed suburban town, with its little white houses and happy, loving families ("Mornin' Sun"). The town could be anywhere; many names (such as Ozone Park and Beverly Hills) are mentioned.

Scene I – Real life in suburbia contrasts greatly with what the Trio has painted. Sam and Dinah are having breakfast, alternating between habitual bickering and lyrical moments of longing for kindness. Dinah is angry with Sam. She accuses him of having an affair with his secretary, which he denies. She also reminds Sam that their son Junior's play is that afternoon, but Sam insists that his handball tournament at the gym is more important, to which she retorts, "To hell with the gym". She needs more money to pay for her analyst, who Sam calls an "out-and-out fake". Dinah says Sam should go too, which suggestion Sam pays no attention to. They agree that this is not the way to live, and they will have a conversation about their relationship problems in the evening. They both ask each other for kindness, ask the other for help "to love you again" and pray that the wall built up between them can be broken down. They continue to argue until Sam leaves for the office, late for his train.

Scene II – Sam, at work, exuding confidence, is dealing with business on the telephone. On the phone, he turns down entreaties from Mr. Partridge, presumably for a loan. The chorus calls him a genius and a "marvelous man".

Then comes a call from "Bill", who he is glad to lend money to: "You'll return it whenever you want to... Is it sufficient?" Coincidentally, Bill is also participating in the handball tournament with Sam. The chorus observes that "When it comes to the giving, no one touches big-hearted Sam".

Scene III – In her analyst's office, Dinah recalls a dream about finding an imaginary garden amid a "black and bare" landscape, and sings about the image longingly.

Meanwhile, at Sam's office, he asks his secretary if he ever made a pass at her. When reminded of an incident, he insists, in a menacing way, that it was an accident and that she should forget that it ever happened.

Scene IV – Sam and Dinah accidentally run into each other on the street. Rather than having lunch with each other, they both make up lies about imaginary commitments to lunch with others. They continue to sing on the stage (though not to each other), reflecting on the confusing and painful course their relationship has taken, and yearn for their lost happiness.

Interlude – Inside the house, the Trio sings of lovely life in Suburbia, detailing the possessions that contribute to the American Dream.

Scene V – At the gym, Sam has just won the handball tournament. He sings triumphantly that "There's a law about men" — how some try with all their might to rise to the top, but will never win; while others, like him, are born winners and will always succeed. "Men are created unequal."

Scene VI – In a hat shop, Dinah tells an unidentified person about a South Sea romance movie called "Trouble in Tahiti", which she has just spent the afternoon watching. (Later, we learn that she has missed Junior's play.) At first she dismisses the movie as Technicolor drivel. But as she recounts the story and its theme song "Island Magic", backed by the Trio, she gets caught up in the escapist fantasy of love. Suddenly self-conscious, she stops herself, as she has to prepare dinner for Sam.

Scene VII – About to enter his home, Sam sings of another law of men — that even the winner must pay "through the nose" for what he gets.

The Trio sings of imaginary evenings of domestic bliss in Suburbia: "bringing the loved ones together, safe by the warmth of the firelight". After dinner, Dinah is knitting and Sam is reading the paper. Sam decides the time has come for their talk, and Dinah, after asking what he wants to talk about, agrees: "anything you say". Yet Sam can't talk; he doesn't know where to begin. He blames Dinah for interruptions, but she has not said anything. "It's no use", he says. In the only spoken dialogue in the opera, Sam asks Dinah about Junior's play, and she admits she didn't go either. He suggests they go to the movies, to see a new film about Tahiti; Dinah consents. ("Sure, why not? Anything.") As they leave, they each long for quiet and communion, wondering if it's possible to rediscover their love for one another. For now, they opt for the "bought-and-paid-for magic" of the silver screen. The Trio makes its final ironic comment, reprising the movie's "Island Magic" theme song.

Orchestral suite
With the permission of the Leonard Bernstein Office Inc. (the musical estate of the composer), Paul Chihara adapted the operatic music into an orchestral suite. In March 2012, the Orpheus Chamber Orchestra performed the New York premier of the adaptation at Carnegie Hall.

Choral version
With the permission of the Leonard Bernstein Office Inc., The Chinese University of Hong Kong Chorus gave a semi-staged performance of the opera with a chamber choir substituting the Trio as scored. On 17 June 2018, the chorus performed the adaptation with Garth Edwin Sunderland's reduced orchestration in their Leonard Bernstein centennial celebration concert "Bernstein in the Theater" at Hong Kong City Hall Concert Hall.

Continuation
Bernstein wrote a continuation, A Quiet Place (1983, libretto by Stephen Wadsworth), which was poorly received. It was rewritten incorporating Trouble in Tahiti in the form of an extended flashback. The opera, set 30 years later, depicts the aftermath of Dinah's death in a car crash and Sam's struggle to reconcile with his adult children.

On screen 
In 1970 the Australian Broadcasting Corporation produced a television version of the opera. It was first broadcast in Sydney on ABC-TV on 19 March 1972. It starred Raymond Duparc as Sam and Marie Tysoe as Dinah.

A version with live singers performing on animated sets was broadcast on PBS in the United States in 1973, later available on VHS and DVD. Nancy Williams and Julian Patrick played the couple, with Antonia Butler, Michael Clarke and Mark Brown as the trio. Leonard Bernstein conducted.

In 2001, the BBC released a film version directed by Tom Cairns with Stephanie Novacek as Dinah and Karl Daymond as Sam.

In 2018, Opera North created a film version, based on the company's stage production, produced by The Space and directed by Matthew Eberhardt, starring Wallis Giunta and Quirijn de Lang. The film was broadcast on Sky Arts in October 2018 and again in October 2020.

Recordings
Trouble in Tahiti was first recorded in 1958 by the MGM Studio Orchestra under Arthur Winograd for MGM Records. It was then recorded by the composer with the Columbia Wind Ensemble and the same cast as the 1973 PBS broadcast. It was released by Columbia Masterworks in October 1974. Extracts were re-released in a Bernstein Songbook compilation CD in 1988, and the Columbia recording was re-released on CD as part of a three-disc Bernstein Theatre Works set in 1991, in the "Bernstein Century" series (along with Facsimile) in 1999, as part of a Bernstein retrospective 10-CD set in 2008, and finally as part of an 18-CD collection in 2017. A third recording, by the Orchestre de Picardie and Pascal Verrot was issued by Calliope Records in 2003.

Dawn Upshaw recorded "What a Movie!" for her 1998 album The World So Wide.

The version incorporated into A Quiet Place features in the Deutsche Grammophon live recording of that opera from 1983.

References 

Sources

External links 
Trouble in Tahiti, work details, leonardbernstein.com
Anthony Tommasini, "A Short Bernstein Opera on a Troubled Marriage", The New York Times, October 10, 2005

Operas by Leonard Bernstein
English-language operas
Operas set in the United States
1952 operas
Operas
One-act operas
Music dedicated to family or friends